Mexico–Papua New Guinea relations are the diplomatic relations between the United Mexican States and the Independent State of Papua New Guinea. Both nations are members of APEC and the United Nations.

History
On 19 May 1976, Mexico and Papua New Guinea established diplomatic relations. Overall relations between both nations have been limited and have taken place in mainly multilateral forums such as at APEC summits or at the United Nations. In October 2002, Papua New Guinean Prime Minister Michael Somare attended the APEC summit being held in Los Cabos, Mexico.

In October 2013, during the APEC summit in Bali, Indonesia, Mexican President Enrique Peña Nieto and Papuan New Guinean Prime Minister Peter O'Neill met and discussed bilateral relations between both nations. In November 2010, Papuan New Guinea Special Envoy and Ambassador for Environment & Climate Change, Kevin Conrad, attended and represented Papua New Guinea at the United Nations Climate Change Conference held in Cancún, Mexico. In November 2018, Mexican Undersecretary of the Economy, Juan Carlos Baker Pineda, represented Mexico and led its delegation at the APEC Papua New Guinea summit held in Port Moresby.

Since 2017, the Mexican government offers each year scholarships for nationals of Papua New Guinea to study postgraduate studies at Mexican higher education institutions.

High-level visits
High-level visits from Mexico to Papua New Guinea
 Undersecretary of the Economy Juan Carlos Baker Pineda (2018)

High-level visits from Papua New Guinea to Mexico
 Prime Minister Michael Somare (2002)
 Special Envoy for the Environment Kevin Conrad (2010)

Trade
In 2018, trade between Mexico and Papua New Guinea totaled US$48 million. Mexico's main exports to Papua New Guinea include: photographic plates for radiographs; lubricating oils and greases. Papua New Guinea's main exports to Mexico include: skipjack tuna; yellowfin tuna and crude oil.

Diplomatic missions
 Mexico is accredited to Papua New Guinea from its embassy in Canberra, Australia and maintains an honorary consulate in Port Moresby.
 Papua New Guinea is accredited to Mexico from its embassy in Washington, D.C., United States.

References 

 
Papua New Guinea
Mexico